Gabrielle Elaine Franco Rose (born January 11, 1977) is a Brazilian-American former competition swimmer who participated in the 1996 and 2000 Summer Olympics. Rose, a resident of Memphis, Tennessee, competed for Brazil at the 1995 Pan American Games and 1996 Summer Olympics, but later represented the United States starting at the 1999 Pan American Games.  Rose attended St. Mary's Episcopal School in Memphis, and graduated in 1995.  She then attended Stanford University, where she swam for the Stanford Cardinal swimming and diving team.  She graduated from Stanford in March 2000 with a Bachelor of Arts degree in American Studies, and in 2009 with a master of business administration degree. She is the daughter of former Holiday Inn CEO, Mike Rose, and his wife Regina Rose.

International career
At the 1996 Summer Olympics in Atlanta, Rose finished 14th in the 100-meter butterfly, 22nd in the 200-meter individual medley, and 23rd in the 100-meterre freestyle. At the 2000 Summer Olympics in Sydney, Rose finished 7th in the 200-meter individual medley final.

At the 1995 FINA World Swimming Championships (25 m) in Rio de Janeiro, she finished 4th in the 200-meter individual medley, with a time of 2:12.64; 6th in the 4×100-meter medley, with a time of 4:12.76; 6th in the 4×100-meter freestyle, along with Paula Aguiar, Lúcia Santos and Raquel Takaya, breaking the South American record, with a time of 3:45.87; and 8th in the 100-meter butterfly, with a time of 1:00.34, new South American record. In the 100-meter freestyle heats, she broke the South American record, with a time of 56.13 seconds. At the 2002 FINA World Swimming Championships (25 m) in Moscow, Rose won three silver medals in the 100-meter individual medley, 200-meter individual medley, and 4×200-meter freestyle.

At the 1995 Pan American Games in Mar del Plata, Rose won a silver medal in the 100-meter butterfly, and two bronze medals in the 4×100-meter freestyle and medley relays. She also finished 5th in the 100-meter freestyle, and 6th in the 200-meter individual medley. At the 1999 Pan American Games in Winnipeg, she finished 4th in the 200-meter individual medley.

Records
Rose is a former Brazilian record holder of the 100-meter freestyle, 100-meter butterfly, 100-meter breaststroke and 200-meter individual medley. The 100-meter breaststroke record was overcome by Patrícia Comini. The 200-meter individual medley records were beaten by Joanna Maranhão in long and short pools. The 100-meter freestyle record was overcome by Tatiana Lemos.

References

External links
 

1977 births
Living people
American female freestyle swimmers
American female medley swimmers
Brazilian female butterfly swimmers
Brazilian female freestyle swimmers
Brazilian female medley swimmers
Medalists at the FINA World Swimming Championships (25 m)
Olympic swimmers of Brazil
Olympic swimmers of the United States
Pan American Games silver medalists for Brazil
Pan American Games bronze medalists for Brazil
Sportspeople from Memphis, Tennessee
Swimmers from Rio de Janeiro (city)
Stanford Cardinal women's swimmers
Swimmers at the 1995 Pan American Games
Swimmers at the 1996 Summer Olympics
Swimmers at the 1999 Pan American Games
Swimmers at the 2000 Summer Olympics
Pan American Games medalists in swimming
Medalists at the 1995 Pan American Games
Sportspeople of Brazilian descent